Schinia rivulosa, the ragweed flower moth, is a moth of the family Noctuidae. The species was first described by Achille Guenée in 1852. It is found in North America from Quebec to Florida, west to Arizona, north to Oregon and North Dakota. There is one generation per year.

The wingspan is 25–31 mm. The moth flies from July to October depending on the location. There is one generation per year.

The larvae feed on Ambrosia species.

References

"Schinia rivulosa". Moths of Maryland. Retrieved March 23, 2020.

Schinia
Moths of North America
Moths described in 1852